Upset The Rhythm is an independent record label based in London with a varied roster of leftfield artists and bands; they also operate as a diverse DIY live music promoter.  Huw Stephens featured Upset The Rhythm as "purveyors of interesting indie" on his BBC Radio 1 show (24 November 2011) as part of his ongoing 'Label Of Love' feature. As of 2015,  Upset The Rhythm had 85 releases.

History

Upset The Rhythm initially formed in 2003  while its members were organising a concert for Deerhoof. By 2015, Upset The Rhythm had organised about 700 shows.

Upset The Rhythm shows occur each week in venues across London from smaller DIY hubs like Power Lunches to more established venues like The Roundhouse. The record label began in the Summer of 2005, funded by a gift of profits from a The Evens show by Ian MacKaye. The label's first release was a mini-album by Death Sentence: Panda!, followed by debut releases by John Maus, No Age and Future Islands. The company works with unusual and upcoming American acts, and also promotes the UK's DIY music scene, releasing records by Trash Kit, Cold Pumas, The Pheromoans, Pega Monstro Silver Fox, The World and Terry.

By December 2013, Upset the Rhythm's live music promotions included working with Tate Britain and Frieze Magazine on their music programming, organising an all day charity concert with artist David Shrigley for Amnesty International and co-founding the art/music festival Yes Way with London gallery Auto Italia South East.

Artists on Upset The Rhythm

Bamboo
Deerhoof
Dog Chocolate
Ed Shrader’s Music Beat
Feature
Future Islands
Gay Against You
Guttersnipe
Lucky Dragons
John Maus
Naked Roommate
No Age
No Babies
Normil Hawaiians
Peepholes
Pega Monstro
The Pheromoans
Primo!
Rattle
Sauna Youth
Terry
Trash Kit
Vexx
Wetdog
Xiu Xiu

References

External links
Official website
Discogs Profile

Underground punk scene in the United Kingdom
English record labels
British independent record labels
Indie rock record labels
Record labels established in 2005